is a railway station on the Chikuhi Line operated by JR Kyushu, located in Imari, Saga Prefecture, Japan.

Lines

Station layout 
The station, which is unstaffed, consists of a side platform serving a single track at grade. The platform is located on the opposite side of the track from the access road and is reached by means of a level crossing. There is no station building but a shelter is provided on the platform. A bike shed is provided near the station entrance.

Adjacent stations

History
This station was opened on the same day as an intermediate station on the new track. The Kitakyushi Railway was nationalised on 1 October 1937 and Japanese Government Railways (JGR) assumed control of the station and designated the track which served it as part of the Chikuhi Line. With the privatization of Japanese National Railways (JNR), the successor of JGR, on 1 April 1987, control of the station passed to JR Kyushu.

Passenger statistics
In fiscal 2015, there were a total of 2,535 boarding passengers, giving a daily average of 7 passengers.

References

External links
Komanaki Station (JR Kyushu)

Railway stations in Saga Prefecture
Stations of Kyushu Railway Company
Chikuhi Line
Railway stations in Japan opened in 1935